Bruce Hodgdon (born ) served as a Republican member of the New Hampshire House of Representatives from 2013 until 2017 from Northwood. He was a member of the legislative committee on transportation.

References

Living people
Place of birth missing (living people)
Year of birth missing (living people)
Republican Party members of the New Hampshire House of Representatives
People from Northwood, New Hampshire